
Walter Peak -  Lyell 4 or L4 - is the fourth highest of five distinct subpeaks on Mount Lyell, three of which are located on the border of Alberta and British Columbia (Christian, Walter and Ernest Peaks). It was named in 1972 by Sydney R. Vallance after Walter Feuz, an early mountain guide in the Rockies. 

"Walter Feuz (1894-1986) never took out an official guide's license since he was underage when he left his family home in Interlaken, CH, but was trained up for the work by his older brothers, Edward, Jr. and Ernest."

Geology and climate
Due to the close proximity of this peak to the central and highest peak (0.6 km (0.4 mi)), see Mount Lyell for geology and climate.

See also
 List of peaks on the British Columbia–Alberta border

References

External links
 Walter Peak photo - the right-most peak only (Christian Peak - AKA Lyell 5 - is on the left): Flickr

Three-thousanders of Alberta
Three-thousanders of British Columbia
Canadian Rockies